Douglas Burke or Doug Burke may refer to:

Doug Burke (water polo) (born 1957), American Olympic water polo player
Doug Burke (tennis) (born 1963), Jamaican professional tennis player